Cannabis in Kentucky is illegal for recreational use, but is legal to process for medical use but only if it is 8 ounces or less and was legally purchased in another state. Non-psychoactive CBD oil is also legal in the state, and Kentucky has a lengthy history of cultivating industrial hemp for fiber since 1775.

Industrial hemp

Hemp was first cultivated for fiber in Kentucky near Danville in 1775, and cultivation there continued into the 20th century even though cultivation had diminished in other states.

A 1914 USDA report noted:

Appearance as a drug
It is unclear when cannabis first became popular as a drug in Kentucky, but The Encyclopedia of Louisville notes mention of the popularity of the drug in the Louisville Times in 1930:

2014 legalization of CBD trials
In April 2014, Governor Steve Beshear signed a law permitting patients to use non-psychoactive cannabidiol (CBD) derivatives with a physician's recommendation, under clinical trials at the University of Kentucky in the treatment of epilepsy, but the law did not include provisions to legally produce or sell CBD.

2015 failed attempt to legalize medical cannabis
In 2015, House Bill 3 and Senate Bill 40 both proposed establishing a medical cannabis framework in Kentucky; both failed to pass out of committee. The anti-cannabis National Marijuana Initiative and the Kentucky Baptist Convention took credit for the defeat of the bills, and vowed to oppose medical cannabis bills in 2016. NMI coordinator Ed Shemelya stated: "The ultimate end game for proponents of – and I don't even like to call it medical marijuana – the proponents of marijuana as medicine is not to sanction marijuana as medicine but the outright legalization of recreational use of marijuana."

2020 attempt to legalize medical cannabis
On February 20, 2020, House Bill 136 passed 65 to 30. It was the first time a medical marijuana bill has been taken up by the full House. The bill proposes restrictions on who can have medical marijuana and where it can be used, and prohibits smoking medical marijuana. It stalled in the Senate due to the COVID-19 pandemic.  The sponsor, Representative Jason Nemes of Louisville, stated that he would be re-submitting the Bill for the 2021 General Assembly.

2022 medical cannabis bill and executive action
Kentucky House Bill 136 was introduced on January 4, 2022. Passed House Judiciary Committee 15-1 on March 10, and was passed by House 59-34 on March 17. The governor of Kentucky, Andy Beshear, said on April 7 that he was considering executive action to permit medical cannabis in his state if the bill was not approved in the state senate. HB 136 did not receive a hearing in the Kentucky Senate by the end of the session on April 15, and days later, Beshear confirmed that executive actions would be forthcoming. 

On June 14, Governor Beshear appointed a 17-member "Team Kentucky Medical Cannabis Committee" through executive order 2022-338 – noting "allowing Kentuckians diagnosed with certain medical conditions and receiving palliative care to cultivate, purchase, and/or use medical cannabis would improve the quality of their lives" and attendant economic benefits – with the purpose of holding public hearings. The committee had its first meeting on June 20. A public feedback website, medicalcannabis.ky.gov, was also created under the order.

2023 medical cannabis bill

See also
 Hemp in Kentucky
 Kentucky Marijuana Strike Force

References